Bastilla axiniphora is a moth of the family Noctuidae first described by George Hampson in 1913. It is found in Asia, including Singapore.

References

Bastilla (moth)
Moths described in 1913